"Pagan Lovesong" is a single by the Irish post-punk band Virgin Prunes, released June 1982 by Rough Trade Records.

Formats and track listing
All songs written by the Virgin Prunes

UK 7" single (RT 106)
"Pagan Lovesong" – 3:28
"Dave-Id Is Dead" – 4:17

UK 12" single (12 RT 106)
"Pagan Lovesong (Vibeakimbo)" 
"Pagan Lovesong" 
"Dave-Id Is Dead"

Personnel

Virgin Prunes
 Mary D'Nellon – drums
 Dik Evans – guitar
 Gavin Friday – vocals
 Guggi – vocals
 Strongman – bass guitar

Technical personnel
 Dave-id Busaras – vocals (B-side)
 Nick Launay – production, engineering
 Virgin Prunes – production
 Kevin Windmill – assistant engineering

Charts

References

External links

1982 songs
1982 singles
Rough Trade Records singles
Song recordings produced by Nick Launay
Virgin Prunes songs